Michael George Hough is a retired Australian Anglican bishop who served in the Anglican Church of Australia and the Anglican Church of Papua New Guinea. He had previously been a Franciscan priest in the Roman Catholic Church. 

Hough was principal of Newton Theological College in Popondetta from 1993 to 1996. He then served as the Bishop of the New Guinea Islands from 1996 to 1998, Bishop of Port Moresby from 1998 to 2001 and Bishop of Ballarat from 2004 to 2010. In June 2010 he announced his decision to step down later in the year. He subsequently returned to parish ministry before retiring in 2019.

References

Anglican bishops of Ballarat
21st-century Anglican bishops in Australia
Living people
Year of birth missing (living people)
Papua New Guinean bishops
20th-century Anglican bishops in Oceania
Anglican bishops of Port Moresby
Anglican bishops of the New Guinea Islands